Boise State University (BSU) is a public research university in Boise, Idaho. Founded in 1932 by the Episcopal Church, it became an independent junior college in 1934 and has been awarding baccalaureate and master's degrees  It became a public institution in 1969.

Boise State offers more than 100 graduate programs, including the MBA and MAcc programs in the College of Business and Economics; master's and PhD programs in the Colleges of Engineering, Arts & Sciences, and Education; MPA program in the School of Public Service; and the MPH program in the College of Health Sciences. In the Carnegie Classification of Institutions of Higher Education, it is among "R2: Doctoral Universities – High research activity".

The university's intercollegiate athletic teams, the Broncos, compete in the Mountain West Conference (MWC) in NCAA Division I.

History

The school became Idaho's third state university  in 1974, after the University of Idaho (1889) and Idaho State University (1963). Boise State awards associate, bachelor's, master's, and doctoral degrees, and is accredited by the Northwest Commission on Colleges and Universities. , it has over 75,000 living alumni.

Campus 
The  campus is located near downtown Boise, on the south bank of the Boise River, opposite Julia Davis Park. Boise State has spent over $300 million since 2003 on academic, residential, and athletics facilities across campus. Through the 1930s, the site was the city's airport.

Boise State broke ground in May 2017 on a $42 million Center for the Fine Arts, which will house sculpture, metalwork, painting, graphic design and other visual arts, as well as gallery space and a digital "World Museum" devoted to high-tech arts experiences.

Albertsons Library 

The school's library is named for grocery pioneer and longtime Boise resident Joe Albertson. It houses more than 650,000 books, over 100,000 periodicals, 107 public terminals for student use, and access to over 300 online databases. The physical structure features a public lounge area, and houses the College of Innovation and Design, including the fast growing degree program in Gaming, Interactive Mobile and Media.

Morrison Center 

The "Velma V. Morrison Center for the Performing Arts" has 2,000 seats in its primary performance hall, and hosts a wide variety of fine arts performances, including the Broadway in Boise series, concerts and other events. The venue opened its doors  in April 1984.

Computer Science Department 

The computer science department moved away from the main campus to a new building in downtown Boise. The CS department occupies 53,549 gross square feet, the full second and third floors of the building. The university's CS program is now located in the same building as Clearwater Analytics and within short walking distance of about 20 more of Boise's top technology companies.

Micron Center for Materials Research

The Micron Center for Materials Research was established with a $25 million gift from Micron Technology, which is headquartered in Boise. Scheduled for completion in 2020, the building was designed by Hummel Architects and Anderson Mason Dale Architects, with Hoffman Construction as lead contractor. The building is designed with one research wing, planned to house sensitive equipment, and state of the art research laboratories and a second wing, to hold classrooms, and office space. This latest donation by Micron marks a total of $40 million invested in materials science and engineering programs and associated research at BSU, resulting in a full complement of degrees in materials science and engineering including bachelor's, master's and doctoral programs.

Other campuses 
Extended Studies at Boise State offers regional programming at the College of Western Idaho in Nampa, Mountain Home Air Force Base, Gowen Field, Twin Falls, Lewiston, and Coeur d'Alene. BSU also offers 29 degrees and certificates fully online. Beginning in 2016, Boise State began partnering with the Harvard Business School to offer the Harvard Business School Online business fundamentals program to Idaho students and the business community. This collaboration is the only such Harvard collaboration with a public U.S. university.

Academics and organization

Boise State's more than 190 fields of study are organized into these colleges:
 Arts and Sciences
 Business and Economics
 Education
 Engineering
 Graduate Studies
 Health Sciences
 School of Public Service
 Innovation and Design

Boise State's fall enrollment in 2016 was 23,886 students, and approximately 76 percent of these students were Idaho residents. More than 90 percent of Boise State's first-year students come directly from high school.

In the 2015–2016 school year, Boise State awarded diplomas to 3,916 distinct graduates, including 18 doctorates, 10 education specialists, 670 master's and 2,998 bachelor's degrees. The university has "High Research Activity" as scored by the Carnegie Classification of Institutions of Higher Education.

Publishing 
Since 1971 the university has published the Western Writers Series, monographs focusing on authors of the American Frontier and American West. The university also maintains an on-line library of publications and documents related to Idaho history through the Albertsons Library.

A not-for-profit literary publisher, Ahsahta was founded in 1974 at Boise State University to preserve the best works by early poets of the American West. Its name, ahsahta, is the Mandan word meaning "Rocky Mountain bighorn sheep," and was first recorded by members of the Lewis and Clark expedition; the founding editors chose the word to honor the press's original mission to publish Western poetry.

The Center for Idaho History and Politics offers a nine-credit place-based field school called "Investigate Boise" which focuses on heritage, government, and urban affairs. Each series of classes results in a student written and faculty edited publication.

Athletics 

Boise State's athletic nickname is the Broncos, and the official mascot is Buster Bronco. Men's teams include football, basketball, cross country, track and field, golf, tennis, and baseball (to resume play in 2020 after a forty-year hiatus). The baseball program was then cut in July 2020. Its women's teams include volleyball, basketball, cross country, swimming and diving, soccer, track and field, gymnastics, golf, softball and tennis. Most of these teams compete in the Mountain West Conference (MWC).

Boise State College joined the NCAA in 1970 in the university division (Division I), except for football, which was in the college division (later Division II) for the first eight seasons.  Big Sky Conference football moved up to the new Division I-AA (now FCS) in 1978, and the Broncos won the national championship two years later. BSU moved up to Division I-A (now FBS) in 1996 in the Big West Conference, joined the Western Athletic Conference (WAC) in 2001, and the Mountain West in 2011. The last two moves came after the conferences dropped sponsorship of football.

Albertsons Stadium 

Albertsons Stadium is home to the Boise State football program. It hosted to the NCAA Division I Track and Field Championships in 1994 and 1999, and has been the home to the Famous Idaho Potato Bowl since 1997.

Boise State Football has a long history of success starting with the junior college days and the national championship team of 1958, coached by the father of Bronco football, Lyle Smith. Now named Lyle Smith Field in Albertsons Stadium, the synthetic turf field was standard green before 1986. "The Blue" was the idea of athletic director Gene Bleymaier and was the first non-green football field in the country.

Ground was broken after the 1969 season, and it opened in September 1970 with a capacity of 14,500. Subsequent expansions were completed in 1975 and 1997, and current capacity sits at around 37,000. In August 2010, the university unveiled a $100 million expansion plan for Bronco Stadium. The first stage will include: adding a new facility to the north endzone to house the football offices, weight room, training room, equipment room and locker room; removing the track; and adding a 13,200-seat grandstand behind the north endzone. Later stages include: lowering the field to add 3,300 seats; completing the south endzone horseshoe; building an east side skybox; and renovating the east concourse. Seating capacity for the fully expanded Bronco Stadium will exceed 55,000.

ExtraMile Arena 

Known as the "Boise State University Pavilion" until June 2004, and "Taco Bell Arena" between 2004 and 2019, ExtraMile Arena is home to BSU basketball, wrestling, women's gymnastics, community events, and several concerts each year. Opened  in May 1982, the arena seats 12,380 on three levels. It has hosted rounds one and two of the NCAA basketball tournament on eight occasions from 1983 to 2009, and the third and fourth rounds of the NCAA women's tournament in 2002.

The construction of the pavilion began in February 1980 on the site of the tennis courts and a portion of the BSU baseball field. The Bronco baseball team played their home games in 1980 at Borah Field (now Bill Wigle Field) at Borah High School,  and the program was discontinued that May. The tennis courts were rebuilt immediately west of the arena, on the former baseball field (infield & right field).

Student life

Boise State's enrollment for the 2020-21 year was 24,103 students, with approximately 66 percent Idaho residents. Boise State University has the largest graduate enrollment in Idaho. More than 90 percent of Boise State's first-year students come directly from high school.

Housing 
Boise State is considered a commuter school, due to more than 86% of its students living off campus. The dominant form of school-supported housing are co-ed residence halls.

Social fraternities and sororities
Boise State has seen a growing in Greek community on campus, from less than a couple hundred in 2010 to over 1,400 today. There are nine fraternities: Alpha Kappa Lambda, Alpha Tau Omega, Delta Sigma Phi, Delta Upsilon, Kappa Sigma, Lambda Theta Phi, Phi Gamma Delta, Pi Kappa Phi, Sigma Chi, Sigma Lambda Beta, Tau Kappa Epsilon, Pi Kappa Alpha, and nine sororities: Alpha Chi Omega, Alpha Xi Delta, Alpha Sigma Alpha, Alpha Gamma Delta, Alpha Omicron Pi, Delta Delta Delta, Alpha Pi Sigma, Lambda Theta Alpha, Phi Mu, Sigma Lambda Gamma, Zeta Tau Alpha.

Notable alumni

See also

References
Informational notes

Citations

External links 

 
 Boise State Athletics website

 
Educational institutions established in 1932
Buildings and structures in Boise, Idaho
Universities and colleges accredited by the Northwest Commission on Colleges and Universities
Tourist attractions in Boise, Idaho
1932 establishments in Idaho
Public universities and colleges in Idaho